William Davis Mackey Sr. (born March 23, 1913) was a lawyer, state legislator, and teacher in Indiana.

Mackey was born in Marvell, Arkansas and moved with his family to Gary, Indiana as a child. He graduated from Tennessee State University, Allen University, and Lincoln University Law School. In 1962 he received an M.S. degree from Butler University.

He was a member of the NAACP.

He was elected to the Indiana House in 1951 from Marion County, Indiana.

References

1913 births

Year of death missing
Indiana politicians